Wrightia flavorosea, was a flowering plant in the genus Wrightia. It was endemic to Sri Lanka, where the plant is known to be extinct. The plant was first described by Henry Trimen in 1885.

References 

 The Plant List
 ipni.org

Extinct flora of Asia
flavorosea
Endemic flora of Sri Lanka